Adam Forde (born 11 January 1982) is an Australian professional basketball coach who is the head coach of the Cairns Taipans of the National Basketball League (NBL). Between 2013 and 2019, Forde was an assistant coach with the Perth Wildcats and won four NBL championships. After a season as an assistant coach with the Sydney Kings in 2019–20, he served as their head coach during the 2020–21 season. He was appointed head coach of the Taipans in 2021, and in 2023 he was named the NBL Coach of the Year.

Forde has also coached in the State Basketball League (SBL), most notably guiding the East Perth Eagles men's team to their maiden championship in 2014. He also spent a season as a West Coast Waves assistant in the WNBL and briefly coached the Hawke's Bay Hawks of the New Zealand NBL in 2021.

Early life
Originally from Perth, Western Australia, Forde attended college at Jamestown Community College in New York between 2001 and 2003. In 2003, he played semi-professionally in the Waratah League for the Norths Bears.

Coaching career

NBL
Forde arrived at the Perth Wildcats in 2011 as an unpaid video tech but was continually promoted during his eight-year tenure. After a stint as a development coach, Forde was appointed the Wildcats' technical assistant on 1 August 2013. He became a full-time assistant in 2015. Under head coach Trevor Gleeson, Forde won four NBL championships in 2014, 2016, 2017 and 2019.

In May 2019, Forde was appointed assistant coach of the Sydney Kings. He helped head coach Will Weaver guide the Kings in 2019–20 to the minor premiership and their first NBL Grand Final appearance since 2008. Sydney were defeated 2–1 in a COVID-impacted grand final series against Perth.

On 4 December 2020, following Weaver's departure, Forde was appointed head coach of the Kings for the 2020–21 NBL season. In his first season as an NBL head coach, he guided the Kings to a fifth-place finish and a 19–17 record, just missing out on a finals berth. He parted ways with the Kings following the season.

On 29 June 2021, Forde was appointed head coach of the Cairns Taipans on a two-year deal. After finishing ninth in 2021–22 with just nine wins, he guided the Taipans to 18 wins and a finals spot in 2022–23, as he was named the NBL Coach of the Year.

On 3 March 2023, Forde re-signed with the Taipans on a two-year deal.

SBL
In 2010, Forde served as head coach of the Rockingham Flames men's team in the State Basketball League (SBL). In 2011, he joined the East Perth Eagles and served as an assistant coach for both the men's and women's teams.

For the 2012 season, Forde was appointed head coach of the East Perth Eagles men's team. He helped guide the Eagles to the MSBL Grand Final, where they were defeated 105–72 by the Cockburn Cougars. Following a semi-final defeat in 2013, the Eagles returned to the MSBL Grand Final in 2014. Forde helped guide the Eagles to their maiden championship with a 99–83 win over the Geraldton Buccaneers. He stepped down as coach of the Eagles midway through the 2015 season.

Forde returned to coach the Eagles in 2019.

WNBL
For the 2011–12 WNBL season, Forde served as an assistant coach with the West Coast Waves.

New Zealand NBL
In July 2020, Forde was appointed head coach of the Hawke's Bay Hawks for the 2021 New Zealand NBL season. He split the role in 2021 with Jacob Chance, a fellow assistant with Forde during his time at the Perth Wildcats.

World University Games
In 2019, Forde served as the lead assistant coach under Rob Beveridge with the Australian Emerging Boomers, helping the team win bronze at the World University Games in Naples, Italy.

Personal life
Forde and his partner Kylie have a son named Carter.

References

External links

Australiabasket.com profile
Perth Wildcats 2015 coaching profile

1982 births
Living people
Australian men's basketball coaches
Australian men's basketball players
Basketball players from Perth, Western Australia
Cairns Taipans coaches
Jamestown Community College alumni
National Basketball League (Australia) coaches
Sydney Kings coaches